Some Delaware high schools are not aligned with a Delaware Interscholastic Athletic Association conference.
 Mt. Sophia Academy
 Caravel Academy
 Salesianum School
 Delaware Academy Of Public Safety and Security
 Delmarva Christian High School
 St. Thomas More
 Centreville Layton High School
 Freire Charter Wilmington
 Delaware Design-Lab High School

References

Non-conference